Agnolo di Baccio d’Agnolo was a 16th-century Italian architect. He built the Palazzo Campana in Villa Gaia, Tuscany.

16th-century Italian architects